Ashok Sitaram Patel (born 23 September 1956 in Nairobi, Kenya) is a Kenyan-born cricketer.

Ashok Patel represented Middlesex and Durham as a left-handed batsman and a slow left-arm orthodox bowler in three first-class matches (1978 – 1986) and 17 List A matches (1977 – 1991).

Patel studied at Durham University, where he earned a Palatinate for cricket.

References

External links
 Cricinfo
 Cricket Archive

1956 births
Living people
Durham cricketers
Kenyan cricketers
Middlesex cricketers
Minor Counties cricketers
Alumni of the College of St Hild and St Bede, Durham